Sharon Kerry-Harlan  (b. 1951) is an African-American artist active in Hollywood, Florida and Wauwatosa, Wisconsin who is known for her textile art. In 1951, she was born in Miami, Florida. She graduated with a Bachelor of Arts degree from Marquette University and studied at the Milwaukee Institute of Art & Design. She went on to work at Marquette University as an Academic Coordinator and to teach textile courses at University of Wisconsin–Milwaukee as an adjunct professor. From July to August 2019, Kerry-Harlan had a solo exhibition at the James Watrous Gallery at the Overture Center for the Arts. Throughout August 2019, her work was on display in the And Still We Rise: Race Culture and Visual Conversations exhibit at the Mariposa Museum & World Cultural Center in Oak Bluff, Massachusetts. In early 2021, Kerry-Harlan participated in the Textile Center and Women of Color Quilters Network’s juried exhibit Racism: In the Face of Hate We Resist. Later that year, Kerry-Harlan's work was displayed in the Museum of Wisconsin Art's Claiming Space Exhibition. In 2022, her work, Portrait of Resilience, from the Flag Series, was acquired by the Smithsonian American Art Museum as part of the Renwick Gallery's 50th Anniversary Campaign in 2022. That same year, Kerry-Harlan's work was displayed in the Madison Museum of Contemporary Art's exhibit Ain’t I A Woman? in celebration of the 2022 Wisconsin Triennial. She also had work displayed in the 2022 Uncovering Black History: Quilts from the Collection of Carolyn Mazloomi exhibition at the International Quilt Museum in Lincoln, Nebraska.

References

External links 

 Sharon Kerry-Harlan's Website

Living people
1951 births
Artists from Florida
20th-century American women artists
Marquette University alumni
University of Wisconsin–Milwaukee faculty
Textile artists
20th-century women textile artists
African-American artists
African-American women artists
20th-century African-American artists
21st-century African-American artists
Artists from Miami
People from Miami